Sarab-e Yas (also Romanized as Sarāb-e Yās and Sarabiās) is a village in Koregah-e Gharbi Rural District, in the Central District of Khorramabad County, Lorestan Province, Iran. At the 2016 census, its population was 2,582 people. They usually speak Laki language.

References 

Towns and villages in Khorramabad County